Second Bureau is a 1936 British spy romance film directed by Victor Hanbury and starring Marta Labarr, Charles Oliver and Arthur Wontner. It was made at Shepperton Studios and based on a novel Second Bureau by Charles Robert-Dumas. It was a remake of a 1935 French film of the same name.

The film's title refers to the French military intelligence outfit Deuxième Bureau.

Synopsis
A French spy, Captain Paul Benoit, manages to steal some German secrets. The Germans send Erna Fielder, an agent of their own, after him, but the two spies end up falling in love.

Cast
 Marta Labarr as Erna Fielder  
 Charles Oliver as Paul Benoit  
 Arthur Wontner as Col. Gueraud  
 Meinhart Maur as Gen. von Raugwitz  
 Fred Groves as Sgt. Colleret  
 Joan White as Dorothy Muller 
 Anthony Eustrel as Lt. von Stranmer  
 G. H. Mulcaster as Yvanne Brosilow  
 Leo de Pokorny as Dr. Weygelmann  
 Fewlass Llewellyn as Director of Schaffingen  
 Bruno Barnabe as Commissaire of Police

References

Bibliography
Low, Rachael. Filmmaking in 1930s Britain. George Allen & Unwin, 1985.
Wood, Linda. British Films, 1927–1939. British Film Institute, 1986.

External links

1936 films
British spy films
British romance films
British black-and-white films
1930s spy films
1930s romance films
Films directed by Victor Hanbury
Films shot at Shepperton Studios
Films based on French novels
British remakes of French films
Films scored by Jack Beaver
Spy romance films
1930s English-language films
1930s British films